The badminton competition at the 2006 Commonwealth Games took place at the purpose-built temporary venue within the Melbourne Convention and Exhibition Centre in Melbourne, Australia from 15 March until 26 March 2006.

Badminton medal count

Final results

Results

Men's singles

Women's singles

Men's doubles

Women's doubles

Mixed doubles

Mixed team

Semi-finals

Bronze play-off

Final

Mixed team preliminary matches were held on 16 March, 17 March, and 18 March. Finals were held on 19 March.

References

External links
Official 2006 Commonwealth Games Badminton results and schedule page

2006 Commonwealth Games events
Commonwealth Games
2006
Commonwealth Games